Nandi Awards presented annually by Government of Andhra Pradesh. First awarded in 1964.

1983 Nandi Awards Winners List 

 Best Screen Writers : Palagummi padmaraju, R.K.Dharmaraju (Bahudoorapu Batasari)
 Second best screenwriter : K.S.Chandramurty (Ananda Bhairavi 
 Best actor : Kamal Haasan
 Best Support actor: P.L.Narayana
 Best Actress: Jayasudha
 Best Support Actress: K.Shakunthala
 Best Child Actor: Master Hari
 Best Cinematographer : S. Gopal Reddy
 Best Screen Play: T.Krishna
 Best Dialogue Writer: Dasari Narayana Rao
 Best Songs Writer: Sri Sri
 Best Editor: G.G.Krishnarao
 Best  Male Playback singer : S.P.Balasubrahmanyam
 Best Female playback singer : S.Janaki
 Best Music director: Jandhyala
 Best art director: Thota tharani

 Best  Film for National Integration : Vimukthi Kosam
 First Best Documentary Film: Pembarthi Loha Kala
 Second best documentary film: Swaram mee chethilo undi
 Third best documentary film: andaram okkate

References 

Nandi Awards
1983 Indian film awards